The Aiguilles Rouges d'Arolla are a multi-summited mountain of the Swiss Pennine Alps, located west of Arolla in the canton of Valais. The main summit has an elevation of 3,646 metres above sea level.

See also
List of mountains of Switzerland

References

External links
Aiguilles Rouges d'Arolla on Hikr

Mountains of the Alps
Alpine three-thousanders
Mountains of Valais
Mountains of Switzerland